The 1934 Hammersmith North by-election was held on 24 April 1934.  The by-election was held due to the death of the incumbent Conservative MP, Mary Pickford.  It was won by the Labour candidate Fielding West.

References

Hammersmith North by-election
Hammersmith North by-election
Hammersmith North by-election
Hammersmith North,1934
Hammersmith North,1934
Hammersmith